Nuapada (Sl. No.: 71) is a Vidhan Sabha constituency of Nuapada district, Odisha.

This constituency includes Khariar Road, Nuapada block and Komna block.

Elected Members

Fifteen elections were held between 1951 and 2019.
Elected members from the Nuapada constituency are:
2019: (71): Rajendra Dholakia (BJD)
2014: (71): Basanta Kumar Panda (BJP)
2009: (71): Rajendra Dholakia (BJD)
2004: (94): Rajendra Dholakia (Independent)
2000: (94): Basanta Kumar Panda (BJP)
1995: (94): Ghasiram Majhi (Janata Dal)
1990: (94): Ghasiram Majhi (Janata Dal)
1985: (94): Ghasiram Majhi (Janata Party)
1980: (94): Bhanuprakash Joshi (Congress-I)
1977: (94): Ghasiram Majhi (Janata Party)
1974: (94): Jagannath Patnaik (Congress)
1971: (88): Ghasiram Majhi (Swatantra Party)
1967: (88): Omkara Singh Majhi (Congress)
1961: (40): Ghasiram Majhi (Independent)
1951: (21): Anup Singh Deo (Congress) and Chaitanya Majhi (Congress)

2019 Election Result

2014 Election Result
In 2014 election, Bharatiya Janata Party candidate Basanta Kumar Panda defeated Biju Janata Dal candidate Rajendra Dholakia by a margin of 9,610 votes.

2009 Election Result
In 2009 election, Biju Janata Dal candidate Rajendra Dholakia defeated Bharatiya Janata Party candidate Basanta Kumar Panda by a margin of 22,620 votes.

Notes

References

Assembly constituencies of Odisha
Nuapada district